Vladimir Kononov (born February 16, 1972) is a Russian cross-country skier and Paralympian. He competes in classification category standing events, and is classified LW5/7 (double arm amputation).

He competed in cross-country skiing at the 2010 Winter Paralympics, where he took the bronze medal in the men's 20 km, standing. He placed 12th in the men's 1 km sprint, and 13th in the men's 10 km, standing.

References

External links

Vladimir Kononov profile on Sochi 2014.com

Russian male cross-country skiers
Paralympic cross-country skiers of Russia
Cross-country skiers at the 2010 Winter Paralympics
Paralympic bronze medalists for Russia
1972 births
Living people
Medalists at the 2010 Winter Paralympics
Medalists at the 2014 Winter Paralympics
Cross-country skiers at the 2014 Winter Paralympics
Paralympic silver medalists for Russia
Paralympic medalists in cross-country skiing
20th-century Russian people
21st-century Russian people